Chatham is an unincorporated community located in Washington County, Mississippi, near the north shore of Lake Washington.

Although an unincorporated community, Chatham has a post office and a zip code of 38731.

References

Unincorporated communities in Washington County, Mississippi
Unincorporated communities in Mississippi